The goliath shrew (Crocidura goliath) is a species of mammal in the family Soricidae. It is found in Cameroon, Central African Republic, Republic of the Congo, Democratic Republic of the Congo, Equatorial Guinea, and Gabon. Its natural habitat is subtropical or tropical moist lowland forests.

References

Crocidura
Mammals described in 1906
Taxa named by Oldfield Thomas
Taxonomy articles created by Polbot